Lyon & Turnbull is a privately owned international auction house based in Scotland. It is Scotland's oldest auction house founded in 1826. It is the largest independent auction house in the United Kingdom outside of London and one of the fastest growing auction houses in the UK.
The firm has its salerooms in Edinburgh, offices in London and Glasgow.

History 
In 1999 Lyon & Turnbull was acquired by a group of auctioneers who had left Phillips, an auction house that was the third largest in the world during the 1990s. They were joined in the enterprise by Sir Angus Grossart, Chairman of Noble Grossart, a Scottish merchant bank, and a past chairman of the trustees of the National Galleries of Scotland. The company's stated aim was: "To rescue a national institution for Scotland and to establish a high quality auction house with an international footprint from a base in Edinburgh."

The firm has a transatlantic alliance with the United States' oldest auction house, Freeman’s of Philadelphia.

Notable sales have included L. S. Lowry’s Glasgow Docks 1947 painting and the sale of the Drambuie Art Collection, which realised over £4 million ($7,836,606 USD).

The building 
Lyon & Turnbull is based in Broughton Place, Edinburgh|Broughton Place in Edinburgh, in a neoclassical building designed by Archibald Elliot which was built in 1821.

References

External links

 
 Freemans of Philadelphia official website

Companies based in Edinburgh
1826 establishments in Scotland
British auction houses
British companies established in 1826
Retail companies established in 1826